A shelter is an architectural structure or natural formation (or a combination of the two) providing protection from the local environment. A shelter can serve as a home or be provided by a residential institution.

In Maslow's hierarchy of needs, shelter is considered a fundamental human need, along with other physiological needs like air, water, food, sleep, clothing, and reproduction.

Types

Forms
 Apartment
 Bivouac shelter
 Blast shelter
 Bunker
 Fallout shelter
 House
 Hut
 Lean-to
 Mia-mia, Indigenous Australian for a temporary shelter
 Quinzhee, a shelter made from a hollow mound of loose snow
 Ramada, a roof with no walls
 Rock shelter
 Tent
 Toguna, a shelter used by the Dogon people in Africa

Applications
 Air raid shelter
 Animal shelter
 Bothy, public supply shelter in the British Isles
 Bus stop
 Emergency shelter
 Homeless shelter
 Housing unit
 Mountain hut
 Refugee shelter
 Transitional shelter
 Women's shelter

Gallery

See also 
 List of human habitation forms
 Right to housing

References

External links 
 
 

Buildings and structures by type